Vilasrao Deshmukh of the Indian National Congress formed his second Maharashtra government after his party won the 2004 Maharashtra Legislative Assembly elections, in alliance with Nationalist Congress Party. Deshmukh had previously served as the State's Chief Minister from 1999 to 2003.

List of ministers
Deshmukh's initial cabinet included the following members:

References

Indian National Congress
2004 in Indian politics
D
Nationalist Congress Party
Cabinets established in 2004
Cabinets disestablished in 2008
2004 establishments in Maharashtra
2008 disestablishments in India